The Musée de Notre Dame de Paris was a small museum dedicated to the cathedral of Notre Dame de Paris and its archaeology. 

It was located at 10 Rue du Cloître Notre Dame, Paris, France. The museum was established in 1951 to present the cathedral's history, as well as archaeological objects found in the cathedral's crypt dating from Roman times to the 19th century. It displayed objects discovered in archaeological digs; drawings, plans and engravings of the cathedral; scale models; paintings; and historical documents including a petition to restore the cathedral signed by, among others, Victor Hugo and Jean Auguste Dominique Ingres.

The museum was open to the public several afternoons per week; an admission fee was charged. It closed in November 2008.

See also 
 List of museums in Paris

References 
 Museums of Paris entry
 Sortir a Paris description (French)
 Steve Fallon, Paris, Lonely Planet, 2004, page 92. .

Defunct museums in Paris
Notre-Dame de Paris
1951 establishments in France
2008 disestablishments in France
Museums established in 1951
Museums disestablished in 2008